Independence County was a proposed county to be created from the northwest corner of Whatcom County, Washington. The proposal had the most momentum in the county elections of 1993, when secessionist interests won a majority of votes on the County Council.

The Independence County proposal, like other county secession proposals in Washington, was organized by construction and development interests (under the banner of property rights), hoping that a separate county would redefine county zoning and land use plans to encourage new development. Proponents of the new county took advantage of rural landowners' perception of tax flow: that property taxes had increased unreasonably in order to foot the bill for infrastructure development in the county seat of Bellingham, Washington. This assertion was bolstered by studies on three of Washington's county creation proposals (including Independence) undertaken by UW Professor Richard Zerbe, but refuted by Whatcom County Assessor Keith Wilnauer.

In 1994 the Independence County movement was based in Deming, Washington, organized by Doug Howard, a preacher, retail landowner, and mortgage lender. The Independence movement had ties to the Wise Use Movement, and anti-environmental interest group. The Independence movement also had ties to other county secession movements in Washington including Freedom, Pioneer, and Skykomish county proposals.

Petitions to propose that Independence County be created were circulated around the proposed area between 1993 and 1994. Many signatories believed that they were signing an initiative to be placed on an upcoming ballot, but it was only a petition to the legislature.

After the Washington State Public Disclosure Commission secured a disclosure hearing into the lobbying actions and finances of the organized Cedar County, Washington movement, the Independence County organized movement (as well as those of other Washington county secession movements) shut down in 1994.

References
 
 

Proposed counties of the United States